Song of the Prairie is a 1945 American Western film directed by Ray Nazarro and written by J. Benton Cheney. The film stars Ken Curtis, June Storey, Andy Clyde, Guinn "Big Boy" Williams, Jeff Donnell, Grady Sutton and Thurston Hall. The film was released on September 27, 1945, by Columbia Pictures.

A preserved print is in the Library of Congress collection.

Plot
Joan Wingate's father, who is affluent, disapproves of his daughter pursuing a career in the entertainment industry. While on a vacation in the western region, Joan secures a position with Dan Tyler's show and financially supports it with her family's resources. Amidst various musical performances, they strive to keep Joan's father from discovering her involvement in the show. However, he eventually learns about it and decides that they will head back to the eastern part of the country.

Cast          
Ken Curtis as Dan Tyler
June Storey as Joan Wingate
Andy Clyde as Uncle Andy Tyler
Guinn "Big Boy" Williams as Big Boy Jackson
Jeff Donnell as Penelope 'Penny' Stevens
Grady Sutton as William Van Welby
Thurston Hall as Jerome Wingate
Deuce Spriggins as Band Leader Deuce
Carolina Cotton as Carolina
Paul Trietsch as Hezzie 
Ken Trietsch as Ken 
Gil Taylor as Gil
Charles Ward as Gabe

References

External links
 

1945 films
1940s English-language films
American Western (genre) films
1945 Western (genre) films
Columbia Pictures films
Films directed by Ray Nazarro
American black-and-white films
1940s American films